This is a list of hotels in Dubai. Dubai leads in the world's highest hotel occupancy rates. In 2006, the Dubai hotel occupancy rate was 86%, the highest ever in Dubai. As of 2019, there were 544 completed and operating hotels and 100,744 hotel rooms in Dubai.

In 1993, the city had 167 hotels with 9,383 rooms, while the number shot up to 272 hotels and doubled the number of rooms to 23,170 in 2002. In 2005, it increased to 28,999 rooms. In 2008, the hotel rooms jumped to 43,419, with 6,105,813 hotel guests and a 70 percent occupancy rate. In 2009, the number of hotel rooms increased to 58,188. In 2010, it jumped to 67,369 rooms, an increase of 9,181 in one year due to the massive rise in visitor arrivals. Dubai hosted a record 10 million visitors in 2012, an increase of 9.3% from the previous year.

In  2013 more than 32,686 hotel rooms were planned, including 17,162 hotel rooms which were under construction. 30 new hotels opened in 2010. In January 2010, the occupancy rate was at 81 percent, the second highest ever for Dubai; however, throughout the year, the occupancy rate settled at 71 percent, an increase of one percent from 2009. The city's hotels experienced a decline of 4.2 percent in revenue per available room (RevPAR), which reached $154 million in 2010.

Statistics
Following are the figures according to the Government of Dubai's Dubai Statistics Centre regarding tourism and hotel occupancy as of the fourth quarter in 2021:

The number of hotels in Dubai was 567 with a total of 112,796 hotel rooms.
The number of hotel apartment buildings was 188 with a total of 25,154 apartments.
According to The Middle East Hotel Benchmark Survey by EY MENA, occupancy rates in Dubai hotels decreased by 0.5% between January and October 2019 compared to the rate of 74% between the same period in 2018. 
Revenue per available room decreased by 15% between January and October 2019 compared to the same period in 2018.

List of completed hotels

Ordered by number of rooms.

List of hotels under construction
List of hotels under construction, on hold, or proposed hotels in Dubai:

See also
 List of shopping malls in Dubai
 List of buildings in Dubai
 Lists of hotels – an index of hotel list articles on Wikipedia

References

External links
 Visit Dubai - Official Tourism Board in Dubai

Dubai
Dubai, Hotels
Architecture in Dubai
Hotels